David Murray "Dav" Pilkey Jr. (born March 4, 1966) is an American cartoonist, author, and illustrator of children's literature. He is best known as the author and illustrator of the children's book series, Captain Underpants, and the children's graphic novel series, Dog Man.

Life and career

Pilkey was born in Cleveland, Ohio, on March 4, 1966, to the Reverend David Pilkey, Sr. and Barbara who was the church organist. He has one older sister. Pilkey was brought up in a conservative
Christian household and went to Christian schools throughout his life.

Pilkey was diagnosed with attention deficit hyperactivity disorder and dyslexia as a child. In elementary school in Elyria, Ohio, Pilkey was frequently reprimanded for his behavior in class and thus usually sat at a desk in the school hallway, where he created the Captain Underpants character. In 1987, Pilkey wrote his first book, World War Won, an allegorical fable inspired by the nuclear arms race between the United States and the Soviet Union, in a national competition for student authors and won in his age category. The book's publication in 1987 was included in the award.

The atypical spelling of his first name came when the "e" in "Dave" was left off his name tag while working at Pizza Hut.

Pilkey graduated from Kent State University. He married Sayuri Pilkey in 2005.

The Adventures of Super Diaper Baby was published in 2002 and was Pilkey's first full complete graphic novel. It appeared at No. 6 on the USA Today bestseller list for all books, both adult and children's, and was also a New York Times bestselling book for Children's Middle Grade. The first Super Diaper Baby graphic novel was published with Scholastic years before Scholastic created the Graphix imprint.

Pilkey took a break from writing for a few years to care for his terminally ill father (who died on November 13, 2008), but in 2009 agreed with Scholastic to publish four new books. The first two are graphic novels: The Adventures of Ook and Gluk, Kung-Fu Cavemen From the Future, released on August 10, 2010; and Super Diaper Baby 2: Invasion of the Potty Snatchers, released on June 28, 2011. Captain Underpants and the Terrifying Re-turn of Tippy Tinkletrousers was released on August 28, 2012, and Captain Underpants and the Revolting Revenge of the Radioactive Robo-Boxers was released in January 2013.

Pilkey and his wife live on Bainbridge Island, Washington.

On March 25, 2021, Dav Pilkey announced on his YouTube channel that he and Scholastic will cease further publication of the book The Adventures of Ook and Gluk, and will remove it from retailers and libraries due to some stereotyping of the characters in the book. Pilkey stated that he intended to showcase diversity, equality, and non-violent conflict resolution. He also stated that even unintentional and passive stereotypes are harmful to everyone. Pilkey will donate his entire advance, past, and future royalties from the book to organizations promoting diversity that are designed to stop violence against Asians.

Publications

Dragon Series

 Dragon Gets By (1991)	
 A Friend For Dragon (1991)	
 Dragon's Merry Christmas (1991)		
 Dragon's Fat Cat (1992)		
 Dragon's Halloween (1993)
 		
The Dragon series was originally published with Orchard Books. Scholastic then reprinted the series in 2019. 	
Dav Pilkey used watercolors purchased at a local grocery store to paint the illustrations in these books. The series became a stop-motion animation TV show with 78 episodes from 2004 to 2007.

Dumb Bunnies

 The Dumb Bunnies (1994)
 The Dumb Bunnies' Easter (1995)
 Make Way for Dumb Bunnies (1996)
 The Dumb Bunnies Go to the Zoo (1997)
Pilkey authored The Dumb Bunnies series using the pseudonym, Sue Denim.

Captain Underpants 

 The Adventures of Captain Underpants (September 1, 1997)
 Captain Underpants and the Attack of the Talking Toilets (February 1999)
 Captain Underpants and the Invasion of the Incredibly Naughty Cafeteria Ladies from Outer Space (and the Subsequent Assault of the Equally-Evil Lunchroom Zombie Nerds) (September 1, 1999)
 Captain Underpants and the Perilous Plot of Professor Poopypants (July 29, 2000)
 The Captain Underpants Extra-Crunchy Book o' Fun (2001)
 Captain Underpants and the Wrath of the Wicked Wedgie Woman (August 29, 2001)
 The All New Captain Underpants Extra-Crunchy Book O' Fun 2 (2002)
 Captain Underpants and the Big, Bad Battle of the Bionic Booger Boy, Part 1: The Night of the Nasty Nostril Nuggets (August 1, 2003)
 Captain Underpants and the Big, Bad Battle of the Bionic Booger Boy, Part 2: The Revenge of the Ridiculous Robo-Boogers (September 30, 2003)
 Captain Underpants and the Preposterous Plight of the Purple Potty People (August 15, 2006)
 Captain Underpants and the Terrifying Re-Turn of Tippy Tinkletrousers (August 28, 2012)
 Captain Underpants and the Revolting Revenge of the Radioactive Robo-Boxers (January 15, 2013)
 Captain Underpants and the Tyrannical Retaliation of the Turbo Toilet 2000 (August 26, 2014)
 Captain Underpants and the Sensational Saga of Sir Stinks-A-Lot (August 25, 2015)
 Captain Underpants 25 1/2 Anniversary Edition  (March 7, 2023)

Captain Underpants spin-offs
 The Adventures of Super Diaper Baby (February 5, 2002)
 The Adventures of Ook and Gluk: Kung-Fu Cavemen from the Future (August 10, 2010)
 Super Diaper Baby 2: Invasion of the Potty Snatchers (June 28, 2011)
Pilkey authored the Super Diaper Baby books and Ook and Gluk under the pseudonyms George Beard and Harold Hutchins.

Dog Man

 Dog Man (August 30, 2016)
 Dog Man: Unleashed (December 27, 2016)
 Dog Man: A Tale of Two Kitties (August 29, 2017)
 Dog Man and Cat Kid (December 26, 2017)
 Dog Man: Lord of the Fleas (August 28, 2018)
 Dog Man: Brawl of the Wild (December 24, 2018)
 Dog Man: For Whom the Ball Rolls (August 13, 2019)
 Dog Man: Fetch-22 (December 10, 2019)
 Dog Man: Grime and Punishment (September 1, 2020)
 Dog Man: Mothering Heights (March 23, 2021)
 Dog Man: Twenty Thousand Fleas Under The Sea (March 28th, 2023)
 Dog Man With Love: The Official Coloring Book (August 1, 2023)

Cat Kid Comic Club
 Cat Kid Comic Club (December 1, 2020) 
 Cat Kid Comic Club: Perspectives (November 30, 2021)
 Cat Kid Comic Club: On Purpose (April 12, 2022)
 Cat Kid Comic Club: Collaborations (November 29, 2022) 
It is a spin-off series to Dog Man.

Ricky Ricotta's Mighty Robot

 Ricky Ricotta's Mighty Robot (2000)
 Ricky Ricotta's Mighty Robot vs. the Mutant Mosquitoes from Mercury (2000)
 Ricky Ricotta's Mighty Robot vs. the Voodoo Vultures from Venus (2001)
 Ricky Ricotta's Mighty Robot vs. the Mecha Monkeys from Mars (2002)
 Ricky Ricotta's Mighty Robot vs. the Jurassic Jackrabbits from Jupiter (2002)
 Ricky Ricotta's Mighty Robot vs. the Stupid Stinkbugs from Saturn (2003)
 Ricky Ricotta's Mighty Robot vs. the Uranium Unicorns from Uranus (2005) 
 Ricky Ricotta's Mighty Robot vs. the Naughty Night Crawlers from Neptune (2016)
 Ricky Ricotta's Mighty Robot vs. the Un-Pleasant Penguins from Pluto (2016)
 Ricky Ricotta's Mighty Robot Astro-Activity Book o' Fun (2000)

Big Dog & Little Dog
 Big Dog and Little Dog Getting in Trouble (1997)
 Big Dog and Little Dog Wearing Sweaters (1998)
 Big Dog and Little Dog Making a Mistake (1999)
 The Complete Adventures of Big Dog and Little Dog (1999)

Other books
 World War Won (1987)
 Don't Pop Your Cork on Mondays (1988) Illustrator only
 'Twas the Night Before Thanksgiving (1990)
 The Place Nobody Stopped (1991) Illustrator only
 Julius (1993) Illustrator only
 Kat Kong (1993)
 Dogzilla (1993)
 Dog Breath!: The Horrible Trouble With Hally Tosis (1994)
 The Moonglow Roll-O-Rama (1995)
 The Hallo-Wiener (1995)
 When Cats Dream (1996)
 God Bless the Gargoyles (1996)
 The Paperboy (1996)
 The Silly Gooses (1998)
Comics Squad: Recess! (2014) contributor as author/illustrator for this anthology
Guys Read: Terrifying Tales (2015) contributor as author/illustrator for this anthology
One Today (2015) illustrator only

Awards
 1986: The National Written and Illustrated by... Awards Contest for Students, ages 14–19 category, World War Won
 1997: Caldecott Honor Award, The Paperboy
 1998: California Young Reader Medal, Dog Breath!: The Horrible Trouble with Hally Tosis, published in 1994
 2007: Disney Adventures Kids' Choice Awards, The Captain Underpants series
 2016: Milner Award, The favorite children's book author, http://themilneraward.org/
 2019: Person of the Year Award from Publishers Weekly
 2019: Comic Industry Person of the Year

References

External links

 
  
  (Dumb Bunnies, 1994 to 1997)
 Beard, George (fictitious character) at LC Authorities – not a Pilkey pseudonym
 Hutchins, Harold (fictitious character) at LC Authorities – not a Pilkey pseudonym

Interviews
 
 "Interview with Dav Pilkey." - Scholastic Kids' Club. N.p., n.d.
 
 
 

1966 births
20th-century American novelists
20th-century American artists
21st-century American novelists
21st-century American artists
American cartoonists
American children's writers
American children's book illustrators
American male novelists
Artists from Cleveland
Captain Underpants
Writers with dyslexia
Kent State University alumni
Living people
Novelists from Ohio
Writers from Bainbridge Island, Washington
Writers who illustrated their own writing
20th-century American male writers
21st-century American male writers